Centris caesalpiniae is a species of centridine bee in the family Apidae. It is found in Central America and North America.

Subspecies
These two subspecies belong to the species Centris caesalpiniae:
 Centris caesalpiniae caesalpiniae
 Centris caesalpiniae rhodopus Cockerell

References

Further reading

 

Apinae
Articles created by Qbugbot
Insects described in 1897